Hundvåg is a borough of the city of Stavanger which lies in the southwestern part of the large municipality of Stavanger in Rogaland county, Norway.  The borough includes a number of islands lying to the north of the main city centre of Stavanger.  It includes the islands of Hundvåg, Sølyst, Grasholmen, Engøy, Buøy, Bjørnøy, Roaldsøy, and Ormøy. These islands are all connected together by bridges and they are connected to mainland Stavanger by the Stavanger City Bridge.

The  borough has a population (2015) of 13,217.

Neighbourhoods
Although the borders of city's "neighbourhoods" do not correspond exactly to the borough borders, Hundvåg roughly consists of the neighbourhoods of Buøy and Hundvåg.

Politics
Hundvåg borough is led by a municipal borough council. The council consists of 11 members, with the following party allegiances:

References

Boroughs and neighbourhoods of Stavanger